Jagatpur is an industrial town located in the Cuttack district of Odisha, India.

Geography

Just near Jagatpur there is the Jobra bridge and the Mahanadi River goes under this. After the Jobra bridge there is the town of Cuttack which was the old capital of Odisha.

Economy

Jagatpur is famous for temples and industry. You can find various industries such as Pepsi located along the banks of the Mahanadi.

Education

There are 5 primary schools, 10 high schools, 1 secondary high school, and 15 technical institutes In Jagatpur. 
The most notable institutes and schools are:

Nimpur High School
Jagatpur High School
Bharatiya Vidya Niketana
 Vivekananda Shiksha Kendra
Saraswati Sishu Vidya Mandir
Jagannath Institute
Chidananda Institute
Ganpati Institute
Sriguru ITC
Lakshmi Narayan Sahu Mahavidyalaya

Healthcare

Sadguru Medical, a state-of-the-art 100 bedded multiplicity hospital with cardiology, nephrology, neurology, gastroenterology, gynecology, and pediatric departments, caters to the need of the industrial town and coastal Odisha.

References

Cities and towns in Cuttack district